Established in 1969, the Duke Diet and Fitness Center is one of America's longest running treatment centers for individuals who struggle with excess weight, a sedentary lifestyle, and associated health problems. The center is designed for adults age 18 and up and dedicated to education about and exploration of major components of successful lifestyle change including nutrition, fitness, behavioral health, medical management, and ongoing support.

Program and methodology 
Clients of the Duke Diet & Fitness Center participate in a residential-style program that is located in Durham, North Carolina, and part of Duke Health. The program focuses on optimization in the following four areas: 1) nutrition/diet, 2) fitness/exercise, 3) behavioral modification, and 4) medical conditions. Clients participate in the program for at least 1 week; the content of the Duke Diet & Fitness Center program cycles every 4 weeks, so a goal for participants is to complete the 4 weeks of content within 2 years in order to become a graduate of the program. First-time participants of the program receive full evaluations and recommendations from a dietitian, exercise physiologist, behavioral health expert and a medical provider. During the program, clients eat 3 gourmet meals a day in a vibrant dining area with fellow clients who come from across the U.S. and around the world. Meal plans can be low in fat or low in carbohydrate or any meal plan in between that best suits the client. Outside of meal time, clients exercise in a fully equipped gym and an indoor, heated, salt-water pool. Clients may exercise individually or in group classes with the option of receiving personal training with an exercise physiologist or Pilates instructor. Additional services include massage therapy, resting metabolic rate measurement and Bodpod body composition measurement. When not eating or exercising, clients attend lectures from experts in the 4 pillars of comprehensive weight management: nutrition, fitness, behavior modification and medicine.

Clients of Duke Diet & Fitness Center experience multiple health benefits during and after completion of the program. In addition to weight loss, clients experience improvements in blood pressure, blood sugar, blood cholesterol/lipids, mobility, pain, sleep and mood. Medications for certain health conditions like hypertension, diabetes and arthritis are frequently reduced during participation in the program. One study demonstrated an average weight loss of 8.2 kg (18.0 lbs.; a decrease of 6.5% from original body weight) over 4 weeks and an improvement in average 6-minute walk distance from 497.6 meters to 563.9 meters, an increase of 18.9%. Another study of participants showed that after two years, 54.9% maintained their weight loss.

See also 
 Obesity
 Overweight
 Dieting

References

External links 
 Online Program from Duke Diet & Fitness 

Diets
Diet and Fitness Center
Organizations based in Durham, North Carolina